Hero's was a Japanese mixed martial arts promotion operated by Fighting and Entertainment Group, the parent entity behind kickboxing organization K-1. Grown from and branched off of K-1's earlier experiments in MMA, including the K-1 Romanex event and various MMA fights on its regular K-1 kickboxing cards, it held its first show on March 26, 2005. The promotion was handled by former Rings head Akira Maeda. At a press conference on February 13, 2008, FEG announced that they discontinued Hero's and were creating a new mixed martial arts franchise, Dream, in collaboration with former Pride FC executives from Dream Stage Entertainment.

History 
Although not as popular worldwide as the Ultimate Fighting Championship or the now defunct Pride Fighting Championships, Hero's was very recognizable in the Japanese mixed martial arts scene, thanks in large part to the visibility and resources of FEG and K-1. Hero's events were sometimes co-sponsored and broadcast on the TBS national television network in Japan. In contrast to PRIDE and the UFC, Hero's promoted only three weight classes: middleweight (-70 kg/-154 lbs), light heavyweight (-85 kg/-187 lbs) and heavyweight (+85 kg/+187 lbs)

United States 
On March 27, 2007, FEG (the Fighting Entertainment Group) held a press conference at the Los Angeles Coliseum to announce their first US event which was to be held on June 2, 2007. The show, named K-1 Dynamite!! USA, was a joint operated venture with the newly formed  Elite XC, British MMA organization Cage Rage, BoDog Fight and the Korean-based Spirit MC. The show was broken down into two parts, with the first part (made up of three fights) being aired for free Showtime and the second part on pay-per-view.

Reformation into Dream 
At a press conference on February 13, 2008, FEG announced that they discontinued Hero's and were creating a new mixed martial arts franchise, Dream, in collaboration with former Pride FC executives from Dream Stage Entertainment.  In addition to established Hero's stars, (such as Calvancante, Akiyama, and Yamamoto) many other top fighters from around the world (such as Mirko "Cro Cop" Filipović and Shinya Aoki) joined the new promotion.

Notable fighters 
Many notable mixed martial artists competed in Hero's, including:

 Sam Greco
 Antônio Silva
 Gesias Calvancante
 Hermes Franca
 Lyoto Machida
 Rani Yahya
 Royce Gracie
 Vítor Ribeiro
 Carlos Newton
 Denis Kang
 Ivan Menjivar
 Caol Uno
 Genki Sudo
 Hideo Tokoro
 Hiroyuki Takaya
 Kazuo Misaki
 Kazushi Sakuraba
 Kiuma Kunioku
 Michihiro Omigawa
 Norifumi Yamamoto
 Shungo Oyama
 Yoshihiro Akiyama
 Yushin Okami
 Jerome Le Banner
 Alistair Overeem
 Melvin Manhoef
 Peter Aerts
 Ray Sefo
 Joachim Hansen
 Sergei Kharitonov
 Jan Nortje
 Kotetsu Boku
 Gary Goodridge
 Brad Pickett
 Antonio McKee
 B.J. Penn
 Bob Sapp
 Don Frye
 Heath Herring
 Jake Shields
 Nam Phan
 Rich Clementi
 Brock Lesnar

Hero's Grand Prix Champions

Events

Event locations 
* Total event number: 19

  Japan (13)
 Tokyo – 5
 Yokohama – 3
 Osaka – 3
 Nagoya – 1
 Saitama – 1

  Lithuania (3)
 Vilnius – 3

  South Korea (2)
 Seoul – 2

  United States (1)
 Los Angeles, California – 1

References

External links
Hero's official website
Bushido FC's official website

K-1

2005 establishments in Japan
2008 disestablishments in Japan
Organizations established in 2005
Organizations disestablished in 2008
Mixed martial arts organizations